Mirny is a rural locality (a settlement) in and the administrative center of Mirny Rural Settlement, Konoshsky District, Arkhangelsk Oblast, Russia. The population was 339 as of 2012. There are 7 streets.

Geography 
It is located on the Plelevitsa River.

References 

Rural localities in Konoshsky District